Xenophyllite is a rare phosphate mineral with the chemical formula Na4Fe7(PO4)6.

Xenophyllite was described for an occurrence in the Augustinovka meteorite, Dnepropetrovsk Oblast, Ukraine. It was approved by the IMA in 2006.

References

Sodium minerals
Iron minerals
Phosphate minerals
Triclinic minerals
Minerals described in 2006